"Don't Worry 'bout Me Baby" is a song written by Deborah Allen, Bruce Channel and Kieran Kane, and recorded by American country music artist Janie Fricke.  It was released in April 1982 as the second single from the album Sleeping with Your Memory.  The song was the first of Fricke's, seven solo number ones on Billboard magazine Hot Country Singles chart.

Fricke had actually sung on several other No. 1 songs in the past, often as an uncredited background vocalist (for example, "Thinking of a Rendezvous" by Johnny Duncan). In addition, she had dueted with Charlie Rich on their 1978 No. 1 song, "On My Knees." However, this was Fricke's first No. 1 song to feature her solo talents.

Charts

Weekly charts

Year-end charts

References

Works cited
"The Billboard Book of Number One Country Hits" (Billboard Books, Watson-Guptill Publications, New York, 1991.
Allmusic — "Don't Worry 'bout Me Baby" by Janie Fricke .

1982 singles
1981 songs
Janie Fricke songs
Songs written by Deborah Allen
Songs written by Kieran Kane
Song recordings produced by Jim Ed Norman
Columbia Records singles
Songs written by Bruce Channel